Movies Anywhere (MA) is a cloud-based digital rights locker and over-the-top streaming platform that allows users to stream and download purchased films, including digital copies redeemed from codes found in home video releases as well as digital purchases from participating services. Movies Anywhere is operated by The Walt Disney Company. The platform provides content from Walt Disney Studios, Sony Pictures, Universal Pictures, and Warner Bros. The system utilizes an internal platform known as KeyChest, which synchronizes content licenses from digital distribution platforms linked to a central user account.

Movies Anywhere was first launched on February 25, 2014 as Disney Movies Anywhere (DMA), with content from Disney, Pixar, Marvel, Star Wars-branded films on iOS with iTunes Store integration; the service has since been extended to other platforms and storefronts, including Amazon Video, Google TV (formerly Play Movies & TV), Microsoft Movies & TV, and Vudu, along with subscribers of DirecTV, Xfinity, and Verizon Fios TV services. On October 12, 2017, DMA was relaunched as Movies Anywhere, with other studios joining Disney in offering their film titles through the platform. Sometime in 2018, titles on Google Play Movies & TV linked through Movies Anywhere were also made available through the "Purchased Movies" heading on a customer's YouTube account.

Until July 2019, Movies Anywhere was a competitor to the UltraViolet platform that was deployed by other major film studios; Disney declined to back the platform in favor of promoting KeyChest as an alternative. On January 31, 2019, the consortium behind UltraViolet (DECE) announced that it would shut down its services on July 31, 2019. The studios remaining with UltraViolet, including Paramount Pictures, MGM, Lionsgate, and many other non-participating movie studios did not move and switch over to Movies Anywhere.

History 
In 2009, Disney unveiled a rights synchronization platform known as KeyChest, which would allow content purchases via digital distribution platforms to be queried and used to build a centralized library. The company explained that this system would allow "persistent" access to purchased content across multiple digital platforms, including television set-top boxes and mobiles. The platform was viewed as being a competitor to UltraViolet, a competing concept developed by DECE, a consortium containing all other major U.S. film studios but Disney.

Disney Movies Anywhere (DMA) originally launched on February 25, 2014, as an iOS app that allows users to link Disney films purchased on iTunes Store into a unified library with digital copies of Disney films purchased on physical media, so that they can be streamed or downloaded. The integration is achieved by linking a user's Apple ID with a Disney account. The app also allows users to browse through a catalog of Disney films available on iTunes Store, access supplemental content such as interviews and behind-the-scenes footage, and participate in the Disney Movie Rewards program. Walt Disney Studios CTO Jamie Voris explained that the app was designed to provide a "rich, interactive experience" around its content as an alternative to "utilitarian" online stores and that Disney planned to seek additional retail partners for the service in the future.

In November 2014, support for Google Play Movies & TV and Vudu was added. In September 2015, support for Amazon Video and Microsoft Movies & TV was added, and DMA apps for Android TV and Roku were also released. In August 2016, Verizon Fios became the first television provider to integrate with DMA, allowing purchases through Fios On Demand to be synced into DMA libraries.

In September 2017, DMA ceased support for Microsoft Movies & TV, with future purchases no longer automatically accessible through the linked library. However, in August 2018 support for the service provider was officially restored under Movies Anywhere.

On October 10, 2017, it was reported that the DMA platform would expand to include content from non-Disney studios under the name Movies Anywhere, with 20th Century Fox, Sony Pictures, Universal Pictures, and Warner Bros. serving as initial partners, with Paramount Pictures, Lionsgate, and Metro-Goldwyn Mayer expressing interest. It would also include titles from Disney's Touchstone Pictures and Hollywood Pictures divisions that were previously unavailable on DMA. The DMA platform service network was relaunched on October 12, 2017. The Verge felt that the new platform could be used to replace the commercially unsuccessful UltraViolet platform (which Disney did not support). For physical copies of films printed pre-Movies Anywhere, these studios now route users redeeming codes formerly meant for their redemption portals and Ultraviolet to the redemption section of the Movies Anywhere site.

Just two months after launch, at the January 2018 Consumer Electronics Show in Las Vegas, General Manager Karin Gilford announced that consumers’ accounts had accumulated nearly 80 million movies. That same month, Movies Anywhere was picked the 2018 winner of Home Media Magazine's inaugural Media Play News Fast Forward Awards, honoring people, technologies, organizations, products, or services that move the home entertainment industry forward. On February 28, 2018, The Walt Disney Company shut down its Disney Movies Anywhere website and mobile app service platform network, transferring its Disney digital movie collection library content to the Movies Anywhere website and mobile app service platform network.

Support for FandangoNow was added on March 13, 2018, with talks also resuming between Movies Anywhere and Microsoft Movies & TV. By then, there were more than 100 million movies in consumer accounts.

On August 6, 2018, it was announced that Microsoft Movies & TV would be rejoining the Movies Anywhere platform service network. By then, the number of movies in customer accounts had grown to more than 135 million.

On December 5, Comcast's Xfinity became the second cable provider, after Fios, to partner with Movies Anywhere; subscribers utilize their TV Everywhere login to connect their account to the service.

On January 31, 2019, Ultraviolet announced that it would terminate its services on July 31, 2019, owing to increased support for Movies Anywhere. While Lionsgate and Paramount dropped out of that service in July and December 2018, they have not made any transition to Movies Anywhere. MGM, the remaining studio that continued to utilize Ultraviolet, also did not transition to Movies Anywhere (although some MGM films like Missing Link and Booksmart also end up in Movies Anywhere, usually through 20th Century Fox Home Entertainment).

On March 17, 2020, Movies Anywhere announced users can now share movies with other Movies Anywhere users. Users can share up to 3 movies per month and the user the movie is shared to has 14 days to watch it, but 72 hours to finish the movie once started. The service officially launched in September 2020.

In August 2020, DirecTV became the first satellite TV provider to join the Movies Anywhere platform.

The logo for Movies Anywhere has been criticized by Australians on social media sites, with the criticism stemming from the fact that the Movies Anywhere logo resembles the logo of the Australian Broadcasting Corporation. The logo consists of a combination of the letters M and A, while the ABC's logo is based on the Lissajous curve. Movies Anywhere is not available in Australia.

On August 3, 2021, FandangoNOW merged with Vudu, although it continued to be under the Movies Anywhere platform with Vudu.

References

External links 
  – official site

Transactional video on demand
Disney technology
Internet properties established in 2014
Internet properties established in 2017
Digital rights management systems
The Walt Disney Company subsidiaries